Mahdia Airport  is an airport serving the village of Mahdia, in the Potaro-Siparuni Region of Guyana.

See also

 List of airports in Guyana
 Transport in Guyana

References

External links

Mahdia Airport
OpenStreetMap - Mahdia
OurAirports - Mahdia
HERE/Nokia - Mahdia

Airports in Guyana